Eucalyptus subtilis, commonly known as narrow-leaved mallee, is a species of mallee that is endemic to Western Australia. It has smooth bark, linear adult leaves, flower buds in groups of nine or eleven, cream-coloured flowers and usually cup-shaped fruit.

Description
It has smooth grey to light pale orange coloured bark. Flowering occurs between February and June and the flowers are cream-coloured or white.

Taxonomy and naming
Eucalyptus subtilis was first formally described by the botanists Ian Brooker and Stephen Hopper in 1991 in the journal Nuytsia from specimens collected by Brooker south of Norseman in 1985. The specific epithet is taken from the Latin word subtilis meaning "fine" or "delicate" in reference to the leaves of the species.

Distribution and habitat
The narrow-leaved mallee is found on sandplains and rises in an area between Lake Grace and Norseman in the eastern Wheatbelt and western Goldfields region, where it grows in sandy-clay-loam soils.

Conservation status
This eucalypt is classified as "not threatened" by the Western Australian Government Department of Parks and Wildlife.

See also
List of Eucalyptus species

References

Eucalypts of Western Australia
subtilis
Myrtales of Australia
Mallees (habit)
Plants described in 1991
Taxa named by Ian Brooker
Taxa named by Stephen Hopper